The Steenbergcross (Dutch for stone mountain cross) is a cyclo-cross race held in Erpe-Mere, Belgium with the first edition in 2002. The cross is not part of any season-long competitions.

Podiums

Men

References

External links

 

Cyclo-cross races
Cycle races in Belgium
Recurring sporting events established in 2002
2002 establishments in Belgium
Sport in East Flanders